Krautheimer (habitational name for someone from any of several places called Krautheim in Baden, Bavaria and Thuringia) is a German language habitational surname. Notable people with the name include:
 Anton Krautheimer, German sculptor 
 Richard Krautheimer (1897–1994), German art historian

References 

German toponymic surnames